Ebrahim Seedat (born 18 June 1993) is a South African soccer player who plays as a defender and midfielder for TS Galaxy in the Premier Soccer League.

Early and personal life
Seedat hails from Athlone in Cape Town.

References

External links
Twitter

1993 births
Living people
Soccer players from Cape Town
Cape Coloureds
South African soccer players
Association football midfielders
K.S.C. Lokeren Oost-Vlaanderen players
Bidvest Wits F.C. players
Degerfors IF players
Cape Town City F.C. (2016) players
TS Galaxy F.C. players
South African Premier Division players
South African expatriate soccer players
Expatriate footballers in Belgium
South African expatriate sportspeople in Belgium
Expatriate footballers in Sweden
South African expatriate sportspeople in Sweden